The 1998 South American Rugby Championship was the 21st edition of the competition of the leading national Rugby Union teams in South America.

The tournament was not played in a host country, but in different venues in each countrie participating.

Argentina (that played with the "development XV") won the tournament.

Standings 

{| class="wikitable"
|-
!width=165|Team
!width=40|Played
!width=40|Won
!width=40|Drawn
!width=40|Lost
!width=40|For
!width=40|Against
!width=40|Difference
!width=40|Pts
|- bgcolor=#ccffcc align=center
|align=left| 
|3||3||0||0||114||31||+ 83||6
|- align=center
|align=left| 
|3||2||0||1||127||46||+ 81||4
|- align=center
|align=left| 
|3||1||0||2||88||62||+ 26||2
|- align=center
|align=left| 
|3||0||0||3||20||210||- 190||0
|}

Results

Notes

1998
1998 rugby union tournaments for national teams
1998 in Argentine rugby union
rugby union
rugby union
rugby union
1998 in South American rugby union